Sanne van Olphen (born 13 March 1989) is a Retired Dutch handball player who last played for Viborg HK in the Danish Damehåndboldligaen and for the Dutch national team. She represented the Netherlands at the 2013 World Women's Handball Championship in Serbia.

References

Dutch female handball players
1989 births
Living people
Sportspeople from The Hague
Expatriate handball players
Dutch expatriate sportspeople in France
Handball players at the 2016 Summer Olympics
Olympic handball players of the Netherlands
Dutch expatriate sportspeople in Denmark
21st-century Dutch women